is a passenger railway station located in the city of Marugame, Kagawa, Japan.  It is operated by the private transportation company Takamatsu-Kotohira Electric Railroad (Kotoden) and is designated station "K17".

Lines
Kurikuma Station is a statin on the Kotoden Kotohira Line and is located 24.6 km from the opposing terminus of the line at Takamatsu-Chikkō Station.

Layout
The station consists of one side platform serving a single bi-directional track. The station is unattended. It used to be an interchangeable station with 2 platforms and 2 tracks, but now one platform has been removed and the site is being used as a monthly parking lot. There are three entrances to the station: both ends of the platform and the side of the station waiting area (near the entrance to the national highway pedestrian bridge).

Adjacent stations

History
Kurikuma Station opened on March 15, 1927 as a station of the Kotohira Electric Railway. On November 1, 1943 it became  a station on the Takamatsu Kotohira Electric Railway Kotohira Line due to a company merger.

Surrounding area
Japan National Route 32
Kagawa Prefectural Road No. 22 Zentsuji Ayaka Line
Marugame City Ayaka Library

Passenger statistics

Gallery

See also
 List of railway stations in Japan

References

External links

  

Railway stations in Japan opened in 1927
Railway stations in Kagawa Prefecture
Marugame, Kagawa